Thomas Kopache (born October 17, 1945) is an American actor.

Career
Kopache was born in Manchester, New Hampshire, the son of Dorothy E. (née Sterling). He is known for his roles as Assistant Secretary of State Bob Slattery in The West Wing and for various roles in the Star Trek franchise. He has also appeared in the stage productions of As You Like It as the banished Duke and in Antigone as Creon.

He has appeared in three of the Star Trek series and, along with Jeffrey Combs, Vaughn Armstrong, J. G. Hertzler and Randy Oglesby, is one of only five actors to portray as many as seven characters. Kopache played a Romulan in the Star Trek: The Next Generation episode "The Next Phase", a hologram in "Emergence" and a Starfleet officer in Star Trek Generations. On Star Trek: Deep Space Nine he played Kira Taban, the father of Kira Nerys (Nana Visitor), in "Ties of Blood and Water" and "Wrongs Darker Than Death or Night". In 1994, he portrayed Tu'Pari in the Babylon 5 episode "The Parliament of Dreams".

Kopache made a brief appearance in No Country For Old Men as a shoe salesman. Kopache guest starred as Vic Feldspar, Craig Feldspar's lisping, Jack LaLanne-like father in "Living Will", a sixth-season episode of Malcolm in the Middle. He briefly appeared as blackjack player Borsalino Cap in "The Contingency", the second-season premiere of the TV series Person of Interest.

"Catheter Cowboy"
In 2017, Kopache appeared on the HBO show Last Week Tonight as the "Catheter Cowboy", a character based on a commercial that aired on networks such as Fox News. Kopache's character would star in a similar-looking commercial and initially appear to talk about pain involving catheter use, but would then explain subjects such as the nuclear triad and the problems the American Health Care Act of 2017 offered. John Oliver bought commercial airtime in the Washington D.C. area and aired Kopache's segment live on stations such as Morning Joe and Fox & Friends in an attempt to send a message to President Donald Trump, as he was aware that Trump watched these shows.

Selected filmography

Film

Television

References

External links
 

1945 births
American male film actors
American male stage actors
American male television actors
Living people
Male actors from New Hampshire
Actors from Manchester, New Hampshire
20th-century American male actors
21st-century American male actors